Ruchovci (also called as škola národní – National School) was a group of Czech poets and writers born between 1845 and 1855. The members dealt with social and national problems that were current at the time. They were against foreign influences on Czech literature. In order to achieve this, they supported patriotism of Slavicism and the independence of the Czech history and the landscape. In 1868 their literary almanac called Almanach Ruch was published.

Authors 

 Eliška Krásnohorská
 Svatopluk Čech
 Ladislav Quis
 Josef Václav Sládek (just in the beginning)

References

See also 

 Czech National Revival
 Májovci
 Lumírovci

Czech literature
Literary societies
1868 in literature